"Invisible" is a song recorded by American country music artist Hunter Hayes.  It was the lead single from his second studio album Storyline (2014). Hayes co-wrote the song in a collaboration with Bonnie Baker and Katrina Elam, while the production was handled by Hayes and Dann Huff. The song was debuted at the 2014 Grammy Awards on January 26, 2014, and was released to digital retailers the same day.

Background 
Hayes wrote this song about the bullying that he experienced while growing up. In an interview with Entertainment Tonight, Hayes said, "To me it's also just about being misunderstood. Just me being in high school, just the smallest scale I know compared to a lot of stories that I've heard, a lot of people that I've met ... yes, I was a total geek, I was a total nerd, and you know, I still am, and I'm proud of that. But it took me a while to realize that it's OK to be proud of that, right? Because in that time and period of my life, if you didn't fit in, what else was there? Fortunately for me I had incredible parents, I had an incredible support system, musicians around me, and that showed me that there was hope -- that there was maybe something else I could look forward to."

Music video
The music video was directed by Ray Kay and premiered on March 13, 2014.

Critical reception 
The song received generally positive reviews. Billy Dukes of Taste of Country called the song a "complex and satisfying expression" of vulnerability, and praised Hayes for choosing a song with a personal message for his big Grammy moment. Markos Papadatos of Digital Journal was complimentary of both the "emotional, powerful and inspirational" lyrics as well as Hayes' conviction, noting that the song indicates growth and maturity over Hayes' debut.

Brian Braiker of The Guardian was less favorable, saying that "the song is anodyne, safe and bland. It’ll do fine." Grady Smith of Entertainment Weekly was also unfavorable, giving the song a "C+" and saying that "His anti-bullying ballad is overbearing, preachy, and perhaps worst of all, boring. If you're gonna write popular music's 457th song about self-esteem, at least don't make it pander to every last cliché."

Live performances
Hayes performed the song live at the 56th Annual Grammy Awards. Entertainment Weekly also graded this performance "C+", with Nick Catucci writing that Hayes "provided the first down moment of the night with a saccharine new song" and that his performance was "most notable for the inspirational quotes from the likes of John Lennon and, uh, Steve Jobs, Lady Gaga, and Johnny Depp projected behind him".

Track listing
Digital download
 "Invisible" – 4:32

CD single
 "Invisible" – 4:32
 "Invisible (Instrumental)" - 4:32

Chart performance 
"Invisible" sold 35,000 downloads in the few hours after its premiered on the Grammy, and on the strength on the few hours of sales, the song debuted on the Hot Country Songs at No. 23, and Country Digital Songs charts at No. 7.  This represents Hunter Hayes' highest ever debut thus far. It also debuted on the Billboard Hot 100 at No. 88.  In the following week it reached No. 1 on the Country Digital Songs chart with 92,000 copies sold for the week, and reaching No. 4 on Hot Country Songs and No. 44 on Billboard Hot 100.

The song has sold 419,000 copies in the U.S. as of June 2014.

Awards and nominations

Charts and certifications

Weekly charts

Year-end charts

Certifications

Release history

References

2014 singles
Country ballads
2010s ballads
Hunter Hayes songs
Songs written by Hunter Hayes
Songs written by Katrina Elam
Song recordings produced by Dann Huff
Atlantic Records singles
2014 songs
Songs about bullying
Music videos directed by Ray Kay
Songs written by Bonnie Baker (songwriter)